R/V Marcus Langseth is a research vessel owned and operated by the Lamont–Doherty Earth Observatory (LDEO) of Columbia University as a part of the University-National Oceanographic Laboratory System (UNOLS) fleet.
The Marcus G. Langseth was dedicated on December 4, 2007, came into service in early 2008, replacing the R/V Maurice Ewing.  
Langseth is intended primarily to collect multichannel seismic data, including 3-D surveys.  The ship was purchased from the geophysical survey company WesternGeco in 2004, having previously been named Western Legend.

The Marcus Langseth was named for Marcus G. Langseth, a Lamont scientist.

In March 2009 Chinese authorities denied the vessel permission to pass between Taiwan and China.

In August 2009, Marcus Langseth was named in a Canadian lawsuit seeking to halt its seismic tomography experiment. 
The lawsuit was dismissed, diplomatic clearance was issued and the ship sailed after a delay of a day.

References

External links 
 Lamont–Doherty Earth Observatory
 LDEO marine operations: R/V Marcus G. Langseth Specifications

Research vessels of the United States
University-National Oceanographic Laboratory System research vessels
1991 ships
Columbia University